= Summary process =

Summary process may refer to:

- Summary offence, a summary way to proceed in criminal cases;
- Eviction, a summary way to evict a tenant in landlord-tenant disputes
